John Terry (Pittsburgh, December 20, 1908 – High Point, North Carolina, April 17, 1970) was an Olympic weightlifter for the United States.

Weightlifting achievements
Olympic Games team member (1936 and 1940)
Senior National Champion (1938–1941)

Notes of interest
John Terry was a world record holder in the deadlift (610 lbs at 132 lbs bodyweight), and many consider him to be the greatest pound for pound deadlifter in world history when the time element is considered. In 2016, the 1936 Olympic journey of the eighteen Black American athletes, including Terry, was documented in the film Olympic Pride, American Prejudice.

References

External links
John Terry – Hall of Fame at Weightlifting Exchange

1908 births
Sportspeople from High Point, North Carolina
Sportspeople from North Carolina
American male weightlifters
Olympic weightlifters of the United States
Weightlifters at the 1936 Summer Olympics
1970 deaths